Peter Joseph Jannetta (April 5, 1932 – April 11, 2016) was an American neurosurgeon known for devising microvascular decompression, a surgical procedure to treat trigeminal neuralgia. At the University of Pittsburgh School of Medicine, he was the first Walter Dandy Professor of Neurological Surgery.

Biography

Born in Philadelphia, Jannetta graduated from the University of Pennsylvania with an undergraduate degree and a medical degree. He stayed at Penn for training as a general surgeon, then completed a National Institutes of Health fellowship in neurophysiology before training as a neurosurgeon at the University of California, Los Angeles. 

During his residency at UCLA, Jannetta was in the laboratory dissecting a set of cranial nerves when he noticed that a blood vessel was unexpectedly pressing on one of the nerves. Jannetta suspected that this abnormal impingement of the nerve might be the cause of the painful facial condition known as trigeminal neuralgia. He devised the microvascular decompression procedure to treat patients with the condition. In addition to helping trigeminal neuralgia patients, the procedure became a treatment option for several related conditions.

He was a faculty member and division chief at Louisiana State University before moving to a similar role with the University of Pittsburgh in 1971. In 1995, he spent a year as Secretary of Health for the Commonwealth of Pennsylvania. Jannetta practiced at Allegheny General Hospital for a few years before he retired. 

Jannetta received a Horatio Alger Award in 1990. The Karolinska Institute honored him with the Herbert Olivecrona Award in 1983. He was married twice, first to history professor Ann Bowman Jannetta, then to art critic Diana Rose Jannetta. 

Dr. Jannetta served as the Secretary of Health for the state of Pennsylvania during the term of Governor Tom Ridge from 1995 to 1996.

Death
Jannetta suffered a head injury after a fall  and died on April 11, 2016, six days after his 84th birthday.

References

Further reading

1932 births
2016 deaths
American neurosurgeons
Perelman School of Medicine at the University of Pennsylvania alumni
Physicians from Philadelphia
Louisiana State University faculty
University of Pittsburgh faculty
Accidental deaths from falls